Phrynops tuberosus, commonly known as the Cotinga River toadhead turtle, is a large species endemic to South America.

Taxonomy
In the past, Phrynops tuberosus has been considered a subspecies of Phrynops geoffroanus, but it is currently afforded full species status.

References

Further reading
Boulenger, George Albert. 1889. Catalogue of the Chelonians, Rhynchocephalians, and Crocodiles in the British Museum (Natural History). New Edition. London: Trustees of the British Museum (Natural History). (Taylor and Francis, printers). x + 311 pp. + Plates I-VI. (Hydraspis tuberosa, p. 233).

External links
 Phrynops tuberosus, The Reptile Database.

Phrynops
Turtles of South America
Fauna of the Amazon
Reptiles of Bolivia
Reptiles of Brazil
Reptiles of Colombia
Reptiles of Ecuador
Reptiles of Guyana
Reptiles of Peru
Reptiles of Venezuela
Taxa named by Wilhelm Peters
Reptiles described in 1870